Jilji of Geumgwan Gaya (died 492) (r. 451–492) was the eighth ruler of Geumgwan Gaya, a Gaya state of ancient Korea.  He was the son of King Chwihui and Queen Indeok.

A passage in the Samguk Yusa indicates that he built a Buddhist temple for the ancestral queen Heo Hwang-ok on the spot where she and King Suro were married.  He called the temple Wanghusa ("the Queen's temple", 王后寺) and provided it with ten gyeol of stipend land.  The temple reportedly endured for five hundred years. A gyeol or kyŏl (결 or 結), varied in size from 2.2 acres to 9 acres (8,903–36,422 m2) depending upon the fertility of the land.

Family
Father: King Chwihui (취희왕, 吹希王)
Mother: Lady Indeok (인덕부인, 仁德夫人)
Wife: Lady Bangwon (방원부인, 邦媛夫人) – daughter of a sagan named Gimsang (김상, 金相).
Son: King Gyeomji (겸지왕, 鉗知王)

See also 
 List of Korean monarchs
 History of Korea
 Gaya confederacy
 Three Kingdoms of Korea

Notes

References 

Gaya rulers
492 deaths
5th-century monarchs in Asia
Year of birth unknown
Korean Buddhist monarchs